Herstein is a surname. Notable people with the surname include:

Adolf Eduard Herstein (1869–1932), painter and engraver
Bernice Herstein (1918–1950), American socialite
Israel Nathan Herstein (1923–1988), mathematician
Lillian Herstein (1886–1983), American labor organizer
Ram Herstein (born 1968), Israeli Professor and Researcher in Marketing and Branding
Ruth Herstein, American chess master

See also
MV Herstein (1939), a Danish freighter